The 2022 Dwars door het Hageland was the 19th edition of the Dwars door het Hageland road cycling one-day race, which was held on 11 June 2022 in the Belgian province of Flemish Brabant. It was a 1.Pro event on the 2022 UCI ProSeries calendar.

Teams 
Seven of the eighteen UCI WorldTeams, six UCI ProTeams, and five UCI Continental teams made up the eighteen teams that participated in the race.

UCI WorldTeams

 
 
 
 
 
 
 

UCI ProTeams

 
 
 
 
 
 

UCI Continental Teams

Result

References

External links 

Dwars door het Hageland
Dwars door het Hageland
Dwars door het Hageland
Dwars door het Hageland